Mayim Chaya Bialik (born December 12, 1975) is an American actress, game show host, and author. From 1991 to 1995, she played the title character of the NBC sitcom Blossom. From 2010 to 2019, she played neuroscientist Amy Farrah Fowler on the CBS sitcom The Big Bang Theory, for which she was nominated four times for the Primetime Emmy Award for Outstanding Supporting Actress in a Comedy Series and won the Critics' Choice Television Award for Best Supporting Actress in a Comedy Series in 2015 and 2017.

In August 2021, it was announced that Bialik would host the primetime version of Jeopardy! After Mike Richards stepped down from hosting the syndicated version of the show later that month, Bialik started concurrently hosting that version as well (sharing duties with Ken Jennings).

Early life and education
Mayim Chaya Bialik was born on December 12, 1975, in San Diego, California, to Beverly (née Winkleman) and Barry Bialik. Her family were Jewish immigrants who lived in the Bronx, New York City. Three of her four grandparents migrated from Poland, Czechoslovakia, and Hungary. She was raised as a Reform Jew but now considers herself Modern Orthodox Jewish. Bialik became a Bat Mitzvah and has called herself a "staunch Zionist". Her name, Mayim ("waters" in Hebrew), originates in a family nickname of her great-grandmother, Miriam. The Hebrew-language poet Hayim Nahman Bialik was her great-great-great-granduncle.

Bialik graduated in 1993 from North Hollywood High School in North Hollywood, California. In acknowledgment of her acting commitments, she was granted a deferred acceptance and attended University of California, Los Angeles (UCLA). She earned a Bachelor of Science degree in neuroscience, with minors in Hebrew and Jewish studies, in 2000.

Bialik has said she did not have the grades needed for medical school. She went on to study for a doctorate in neuroscience. She took a break from studies in 2005 to return to acting. She returned to earn her Doctor of Philosophy degree in neuroscience from UCLA in 2007 under Dr. James McCracken. Her dissertation was titled "Hypothalamic regulation in relation to maladaptive, obsessive-compulsive, affiliative and satiety behaviors in Prader–Willi syndrome".

Acting career

Bialik started her career as a child actress in the late 1980s. Her early roles included the 1988 horror film Pumpkinhead (her first acting job) and guest appearances on The Facts of Life (two final-season episodes) and Beauty and the Beast. In 1988–89, she appeared in eight episodes of the sitcom Webster as Frieda, Webster's classmate. It was for Beauty and the Beast, where she played a sewer-dwelling girl named Ellie (with about ten lines of dialogue) that she obtained her Screen Actors Guild (SAG) card. She appeared in three episodes of MacGyver as Lisa Woodman. She appeared in Beaches (1988), playing Bette Midler's character as a young girl. Many contemporary reviews singled out her performance as a strong point in the film. She appeared in the music video for Michael Jackson's song "Liberian Girl". In 1990, she was tied to two television pilots, Fox's Molloy and NBC's Blossom. Molloy produced six episodes for a tryout run, followed by the shooting of the pilot special for Blossom. The latter aired two weeks before the Fox series and garnered higher ratings. When Molloy folded after its six episodes, Blossom premiered as a mid-season replacement on January 3, 1991, and aired until May 22, 1995.

On September 8, 1992, Bialik was a celebrity contestant guest in the episode "Disturbing The Heavenly Peace", the first episode of the second season of the PBS game show Where In The World Is Carmen Sandiego? She had a major part in the Woody Allen comedy film Don't Drink the Water in 1994. Between 1995 and 2005, she mostly did voiceover work for cartoons, such as The Real Adventures of Jonny Quest, Disney's Recess and Kim Possible, Cartoon Network's Johnny Bravo, and Nickelodeon's Hey Arnold!. She appeared in the feature film Kalamazoo? (2005) and in three episodes of the HBO comedy series Curb Your Enthusiasm as Jodi Funkhouser, the daughter of a friend of Larry David. The character transitioned to male in a later episode, going by the name Joey, and was recast to Chaz Bono. Bialik also made guest appearances as a fictionalized version of herself in the series Fat Actress and in an episode of Saving Grace.

Bialik had a recurring role as the high school guidance counselor in ABC Family's The Secret Life of the American Teenager. In 2009, Clinton Kelly nominated her for a makeover on TLC's What Not To Wear. She joined the cast of The Big Bang Theory as Dr. Amy Farrah Fowler in 2010. Her first appearance was in the season3 finale as a potential love interest for the character of Sheldon Cooper (Jim Parsons). In season 4, she began as a recurring character playing Sheldon's "friend that's a girl, but not a girlfriend." Beginning with the 8th episode of season4, she became part of the main cast. Amy is a neurobiologist, which is related to Bialik's real-life doctorate in neuroscience. Bialik's performance in The Big Bang Theory earned her Emmy Award nominations in 2012, 2013, 2014, and 2015 for Outstanding Supporting Actress in a Comedy Series. Bialik was one of seven actresses who had a "quirky" personality to audition for the role. Before she joined the cast, in the episode "The Bat Jar Conjecture", Raj suggests recruiting the real-life Bialik to their Physics Bowl team, saying "You know who's apparently very smart is the girl who played TV's Blossom. She got a Ph.D. in neuroscience or something." She is one of the guest stars on the 2014 Steve Carell improvisational sketch show Riot.

In August 2014, Bialik began hosting a revival of Candid Camera on TV Land along with Peter Funt. Her most recent movie appearance was in a Lifetime Christmas movie, The Flight Before Christmas.

In 2019, Bialik appeared in a commercial for IBM. On August 20, 2019, it was announced that she and her new production company, Sad Clown Productions, had signed exclusive contracts with Warner Bros. Entertainment. Mackenzie Gabriel-Vaught, a former executive at Chuck Lorre Productions, is Sad Clown's head of development. Sad Clown Productions, in conjunction with Jim Parsons's That's Wonderful Productions, BBC Studios, and Miranda Hart, executive-produces a starring vehicle for Bialik, Call Me Kat, based on the British series Miranda. A co-production of Warner Bros. and Fox Entertainment, it premiered on Fox on January 3, 2021 and was renewed for a second season in May 2021.

From May 31 to June 11, 2021, Bialik was a guest host of Jeopardy! On August 11, 2021, it was announced that she would host the series' future primetime specials and spinoffs. When executive producer Mike Richards resigned as host after one week, it was announced that Bialik would guest-host the show for three weeks. Her contract was extended to seven weeks; she would then alternate with Ken Jennings for the rest of the calendar year. On December 8, 2021, it was announced that Bialik and Jennings would continue to host the show for the rest of the 2021–22 season. On July 27, 2022, it was announced that Bialik and Jennings would be the show's permanent hosts in a job-sharing arrangement.

Other works and writings

Grok Nation
Bialik founded Grok Nation (originally styled "GrokNation") in August 2015 to facilitate conversations among people of different ages and backgrounds about contemporary issues. It aimed to engage readers in online conversations that lead to offline action, mobilizing them to change the world as a community. To grok means to understand in a profound manner. (The term comes from the 1961 science fiction novel Stranger in a Strange Land by Robert A. Heinlein.) Bialik had written on a similar idea for JTA-affiliated Jewish parenting site Kveller for five years. She announced and described her new creation on Kveller.

Along with former Sassy writer and editor Christina Kelly, Bialik relaunched Grok Nation as a women's lifestyle site in March 2018. The site ceased updates in March 2019, with new content shifting to Bialik's email newsletter.

Books
Bialik has written two books by herself, and two books with pediatrician Jay Gordon. Beyond the Sling is about attachment parenting, while Mayim's Vegan Table contains over 100 of Bialik's vegan recipes. Her third book, Girling Up, is about the struggles of and ways in which girls grow up, showing the scientific ways in which their bodies change. Its successor, Boying Up (2018) analyzes the science, anatomy, and mentality of growing up as a boy, and the physical and mental changes and challenges boys face while transitioning from adolescence to adulthood.

The New York Times op-ed
After the Harvey Weinstein sexual misconduct allegations surfaced, Bialik wrote a New York Times op-ed in which she described the entertainment industry as one "that profits on the exploitation of women... [and] the objectification of women". With regard to protecting herself from sexual harassment, Bialik wrote that she dressed modestly and did not act flirtatiously with men, adding, "In a perfect world, women should be free to act however they want. But our world isn't perfect. Nothing—absolutely nothing—excuses men for assaulting or abusing women. But we can't be naïve about the culture we live in." Bialik's article drew backlash from critics who said she was insinuating that modesty and a conservative wardrobe can guard one against sexual assault. Patricia Arquette tweeted, "I have to say I was dressed non-provocatively at 12 walking home from school when men masturbated at me. It's not the clothes." In response, Bialik said she regretted that the piece "became what it became" and participated in a Facebook Live event hosted by The New York Times to answer questions about it.

Podcast 
In January 2021, Bialik started the podcast Mayim Bialik's Breakdown, which focuses on mental health issues.

Film
Bialik wrote and directed her first film, As They Made Us, about a divorced mom juggling her family's needs and her own quest for love. Dustin Hoffman and Candice Bergen starred as well as Simon Helberg, Bialik's former The Big Bang Theory castmate. The film was expected to premiere in late 2020, but the COVID-19 pandemic delayed filming. Ash Christian was attached to the project, but died in August 2020. Principal photography began in June 2021. The film was released on April 8, 2022.

Personal life
Bialik married Michael Stone on August 31, 2003, in a Victorian-themed ceremony that included traditional Jewish wedding customs. They have two sons together. They announced their divorce in November 2012, and it was finalized six months later.

Bialik returned to television in 2010, as opposed to continuing her scientific career, so she could spend more time with her children.

In a 2012 interview, Bialik called herself an "aspiring Modern Orthodox". During the 2014 Gaza Conflict, she donated money to the Israel Defense Forces for armored vests. She has also appeared in several YouTube cameos as Blossom and Amy Farrah Fowler, asking questions about Jewish beliefs. The videos are produced by Allison Josephs, Bialik's Judaism study partner, whom she met with the help of Partners in Torah.

In 2014, Bialik was awarded an honorary Doctor of Humane Letters degree from Boston University.

Bialik is a vegan and a founding member of the Shamayim V'Aretz Institute, a Jewish organization that advocates the ethical treatment of animals. In 2017, she announced that she and vegan chef Ali Cruddas had opened Bodhi Bowl, a vegan restaurant in Los Angeles. It closed permanently in 2020 due to the COVID-19 pandemic.

She said on The Late Late Show with James Corden that she identified herself as a feminist.

In a 2009 interview, Bialik said of her family: "We are a non-vaccinating family, but I make no claims about people's individual decisions. We based ours on research and discussions with our pediatrician, and we've been happy with that decision, but obviously there's a lot of controversy about it." In October 2020, amid the COVID-19 pandemic, she said that though she had not received a vaccination in 30 years, she planned to be vaccinated against both the flu and the SARS-CoV-2 virus and that "As of today, my children may not have had every one of the vaccinations that your children have, but my children are vaccinated." Bialik has also said that her children were not vaccinated at the time of her 2012 book Beyond the Sling, but that they have since received a "delayed" vaccination schedule.

Filmography

Film

Television

Web

Video games

Written works

Non-academic
 
 
 Bialik, Mayim (2017) Girling Up: How to be Strong, Smart and Spectacular. Philomel Books. .
 Bialik, Mayim (2018) Boying Up: How to be Brave, Bold and Brilliant. Philomel Books. .
Bialik, Mayim (2021) Flash Facts. DC Comics.

Academic

Awards and nominations

See also
 List of artists and entertainers with advanced degrees

References

Further reading

External links

 
 Grok Nation
 
 
 Mayim Bialik on kveller

1975 births
20th-century American actresses
21st-century American actresses
Actresses from San Diego
American child actresses
American feminists
American film actresses
American game show hosts
American neuroscientists
American Modern Orthodox Jews
American people of Czech-Jewish descent
American people of Hungarian-Jewish descent
American people of Polish-Jewish descent
American television actresses
American voice actresses
American women neuroscientists
American Zionists
Animal welfare workers
American Ashkenazi Jews
Baalei teshuva
Jeopardy!
Jewish American actresses
Jewish American scientists
Jewish American writers
Jewish neuroscientists
Living people
North Hollywood High School alumni
Orthodox Jewish feminists
University of California, Los Angeles alumni
Writers from San Diego
21st-century American Jews